Sam Walsh AO (born 27 December 1949) is an Australian businessman who was elected to the Mitsui & Co board as a non-executive Director on 21 June 2017. Prior to this he was chief executive officer (CEO) of London-based mining company Rio Tinto Group, from 2013 to 2016.

Prior to becoming CEO of Rio Tinto, Walsh served as Rio Tinto chief of the Iron Ore group, and of Rio Tinto Australia. Based in the Australian city of Perth, he oversaw company's mining operations and expansions in Pilbara, Western Australia.

Early life
Sam Walsh was born 1949 and he grew up in the Melbourne seaside suburb of Brighton. He was one of five children. As a boy he actively engaged in weekly church going, scouting, and learning to play the piano and the trumpet. When Walsh was 15, his father was ill and after a series of operations his father died suddenly of a heart attack. Walsh described the death of his father as a time when everything changed.

"My mother had never even written a cheque, she had never looked after the bills and that was a role I stepped into. I was managing the home finances and being the leader of the family, which continued on. You lose a lot. You lose the father figure, the advice and counsel. There's something lost that you don't get back. But if I look back, it did throw me in the deep end early and I swam and swam well."

Walsh attended Brighton Grammar School and Taylor's College in Melbourne. He graduated with a Bachelor of Commerce from Melbourne University, and he completed a Fellowship Program at Kettering University in Michigan. He became a Fellow of Australian Institute of Management, Australasian Institute of Mining and Metallurgy, Chartered Institute of Purchasing and Supply Management, Australian Institute of Company Directors, The Institute of Directors (UK) and Australian Academy of Technical Sciences and Engineering.

After graduating in commerce from Melbourne University, Walsh began his career as a trainee buyer at General Motors. During the next 20 years in the automotive industry, he was promoted to and held senior positions at General Motors and at Nissan Australia.

Mining
Walsh joined Rio Tinto in 1991. He subsequently held a number of management positions within Rio Tinto, including chief executive of the Aluminium group 2001-2004, and chief executive of the Iron Ore group 2004-2013.  His responsibilities covered operations and projects in Australia, Brazil, Canada, Guinea and India, as well as Dampier Salt and Rio Tinto Marine. During 2004-2009, he oversaw the rapid expansion of the Iron Ore group. More than US$20 billion was spent on mine expansions and major infrastructure developments with net earnings exceeding US$9 billion.

Meanwhile, in 2005 Walsh was appointed a director of the Western Australian Chamber of Commerce and Industry, and he was appointed a director of Seven West Media in 2008. The following year he was appointed a director of Rio Tinto. Residing in Perth, Walsh actively supported the arts in Western Australia. In 2008, he became Chairman of WA chapter of Australian Business Arts Foundation, Chairman of the Chamber of Arts and Culture WA and Chairman of the Black Swan State Theatre. He was also president of the Western Australian branch of Scouts Australia.

In 2010, Walsh was appointed an Officer in the General Division of the Order of Australia.

On 17 January 2013, Walsh was appointed CEO of Rio Tinto Group, London. In his first year at the helm, Walsh took the company from a US$3 billion loss to a US$3.7 billion profit. According to the company annual report in March 2014, Walsh was paid US$9.1 million in 2013, up 44% from the $6.3 million he earned in 2012. The figure included salary, a cash bonus, shares and other benefits. His predecessor Tom Albanese was paid 4 million pounds ($6.7 million) in 2012. In return, the company reported Walsh exceeded expectations. He promised to cut operating costs by $2bn last year and achieved $2.3bn. He said he would cut exploration and development costs by $750 million and he cut them by $1bn. He vowed to pull capital expenditure down from more than $17.5bn to $13bn, and he hit that target.

On 27 March 2014, Walsh was awarded the Honorary Degree of Doctor of Commerce at the graduation ceremony of The University of Western Australia.

Rio Tinto Chairman Jan du Plessis confirmed on 23 October 2014, the company had retained Walsh for the longer term and Walsh would continue as CEO of Rio Tinto beyond the end of 2015. Originally, he was given a three-year contract. Walsh described his retention as a time to turn around the company fortunes by engendering the successful culture of how the company handled business. However, in March 2016 Walsh announced he was retiring on 1 July 2016. Du Plessis revealed Jean-Sebastien Jacques, whom Walsh appointed to head Rio Tinto copper and coal, would be the new CEO.

According to resource analyst Tim Treadgold, "Mr Walsh was leaving the company in reasonably good shape. He was handed a very difficult job but he had a reputation for getting things done. I think Sam has been a breath of fresh air at Rio, he's cleaned up a lot of mistakes they've made. But it is probably time for a new and younger man to come in."

It was reported, Walsh would receive $1.4 million to cover the remaining nine months of his contract.

In 2021, Walsh was appointed to the Order of the Rising Sun, with Gold Rays and Neck Ribbon.

Controversies
In November 2016, Walsh was one of two former Rio Tinto Chief Executives linked through leaked emails of former Rio Tinto executive Alan Davies to a payment of $10.5 million USD payment to a consultant Francois de Combret associated with the development of the Simandou iron ore mine in Guinea.
The SFO investigation is still on-going in October 2020, with Rio Tinto seeking a deferred prosecution agreement.  In June 2020, ASIC indicated that Walsh was not a person of interest in their investigations. ASIC has since dropped their investigation of the matter. 

Based on Rio Tinto submission to the Senate Enquiry, Sam Walsh was the CEO of Rio Tinto when the controversial decision of presenting only one mining plan to the PKKP people was made. This led to the destruction of Juukan 1 & 2 sacred sites in May 2020. 3 other mining plans were considered. They didn't involve disturbing the sites. The choice of the mining plan was driven by access to less than 10 Million Tonnes of high grade iron ore for an incremental value of $138m.  During Walsh's term as CEO the Juukan Gorge was not disturbed following his verbal instruction not to mine the Gorge.

Carbon emissions & economic growth

Carbon emissions

Sam Walsh appeared on ABC 7.30 Report with presenter Leigh Sales ahead of the G20 Leaders Summit in Brisbane, November 2014. As CEO of the second largest mining company in the world, Walsh welcomed the deal between the US and China to reduce carbon emissions. The deal was announced at the Asia-Pacific leaders meeting in Beijing. Walsh viewed the focus of the announcement on technology advances as the key to solving carbon emissions.

According to Walsh, Rio Tinto reduced carbon emissions during the previous five years by 25%. Walsh reported, Rio Tinto invested $1 billion on HIsmelt - a more environmentally-friendly way of producing steel – and Rio Tinto was continuing that work in the Netherlands and in China. As well, Rio Tinto spent $100 million on carbon sequestration projects.

Walsh acknowledged Rio Tinto supported market based mechanisms to reduce carbon emissions. He said, “I think as you speak to leaders around the world on this issue, everybody is in agreement that you need to establish an international regime in terms of trading emissions.”

Although Walsh viewed coal as an important ingredient for energy and power for the next 50 years, Walsh moved Rio Tinto out of Coal completely. He also viewed renewable sources of wind, solar, and tidal power as avenues that required focus.

Economic growth

As a member of the B20, the business arm of the G20, Walsh regarded political stability worldwide as one of the issues the B20 team promoted. Political stability provided business with the certainty required to achieve the G20 finance managers target of increasing world GDP by two per cent for the following five years. Walsh also identified government infrastructure investment geared to trade, anti-corruption agreements, and tax reforms as important issues for economic growth.

Career

Business

CEO
Rio Tinto Group 2013–2016

Chief executive
Iron Ore and Australia, Rio Tinto plc & Rio Tinto Ltd 2004-13
Aluminium group of Rio Tinto Ltd 2001-04

Chair
B20 Anti-Corruption Taskforce (co-chair) 2015–2016
Australia-India CEO Forum (co-chair), 2015–2016
BG Australia Advisory Board 2012
Rio Tinto Western Australia Future Fund, December 2004 - April 2011

Director
Mitsui & Co, non-executive June 21, 2017 -
Rio Tinto Group, executive June 4, 2009 – 2016
Seven West Media, non-executive director 2008-13
Committee for Perth 2006-10
Western Australian Chamber of Commerce and Industry 2005-06
Australian Chamber of Commerce and Industry 2003-05
Australian Mines and Metals Association 2001-05
North Limited, 1997-2000
 Australia Council for the Arts 2016 - 2021
 Banjima Aboriginal Corporation 2021 - 2022
 Ma'Aden Mining (Saudi Arabia) 2020 - 2022

Fellow
Australian Institute of Company Directors 
Australian Institute of Management
Australasian Institute of Mining and Metallurgy
Chartered Institute of Procurement and Supply
Australian Academy of Technical Sciences and Engineering
Institute of Company Directors (UK)

Vice president
Australia-Japan Business Cooperation Committee 2005-13

Community
Life Member, Chamber of Arts and Culture WA 2013 -

Chair
Australia Council for the Arts 2018 - 2021
Chamber of Arts and Culture WA, 2010-13
Black Swan State Theatre Company, 2009-13
WA Chapter of the Australia Business Arts Foundation, 2009-13
Art Gallery Western Australia, 2017 - 2018
Perth Diocesan Trust, 2016 -
Royal Flying Doctor Service (Western Operations), 2017 -
Accenture Global Mining Council 2017 -
 Gold Corporation (Australia) the Perth Mint 2019 -

Patron
Trustee of the Royal Opera House, 2014– 2016
Black Swan State Theatre Company, 2013 - 2016
The University of Western Australia Hackett Foundation, 2010–present
State Library of Western Australia, 2009-13

President
Scouts Australia, WA branch, 2010-13
Chartered Institute of Procurement and Supply (UK) 2016 - 2018

Honours

 Order of the Rising Sun, with Gold Rays and Neck Ribbon, 2021
 AusIMM Medal 2015
 Honorary Degree of Doctor of Commerce at the graduation ceremony of University of Western Australia, 2014
 Graduate of Distinction, Lifetime Achievement Award from The University of Melbourne Faculty of Business and Economics, 2014
 Knight Commander of Justice, Sovereign Order of St John of Jerusalem, 2018
 CIPS Award for CEO Procurement Champion, 2013
 Gold Medal award by the Australian Institute of Company Directors for his leadership contribution within the wider community, 2012
 Richard Pratt Business Arts Leadership Award, 2011
 Hall of Fame, Brighton Grammar School, 2010
 Honorary Doctor of Commerce by Edith Cowan University in recognition of his distinguished contribution to business and the community, 2010
 Officer in the General Division of the Order of Australia, 2010
 Western Australian Citizen of the Year, Industry & Commerce and an Australian Export Hero, 2007
 Queen's Scout, 1967

Family
Walsh lives in Perth with his wife Leanne. He has three children and five grandchildren.

References

1949 births
Living people
People educated at Brighton Grammar School
British mining businesspeople
Australian chief executives
People of Rio Tinto (corporation)
Officers of the Order of Australia
University of Melbourne alumni
Australian mining entrepreneurs
Fellows of the Australian Institute of Company Directors
People from Brighton, Victoria
Businesspeople from Melbourne